Double Fun is the fourth solo album by Robert Palmer, released in 1978. Self-produced, this pop album is influenced by multiple genres including blue-eyed soul, disco and heavy rock but maintains an overall consistency of production which holds it all together. The album peaked at number 45 on the Billboard Pop Albums chart in 1978, his highest rank up to that point, and includes a top 20 hit, "Every Kinda People".

The hit single from the album "Every Kinda People" was written by former Free bassist Andy Fraser. Fraser recorded his own version of the song which he never released but which Palmer heard. This album and the hit single paved the way for his next album Secrets which reached No. 19 on the Billboard charts and gave Palmer his biggest hit yet with the Moon Martin penned "Bad Case of Loving You (Doctor, Doctor)".

The album cracked the Billboard Top 100 peaking at No. 45 thanks to the success of "Every Kinda People", and two follow up singles continued to keep the album afloat on the charts. The last track "You're Going to Get What's Coming" penned by Palmer later became a hit single (reaching No. 73 on the Billboard charts in 1980) for Bonnie Raitt and was featured on her 1979 album The Glow. Double Fun peaked at No. 10 in the Netherlands and No. 29 in New Zealand.

2012 reissue
Double Fun was reissued on 24 January 2012 by Culture Factory USA, an independent label that specialises in cult artists. The reissue CD is packaged in a miniature replica of the original quality vinyl packaging complete with an inner sleeve that features the original lyrics, photo of Palmer and credits for the album. The label side of the CD features a replica of what the original Island label looked like at the time of issue and even features "grooves" as if the black CD is made of vinyl.

The reissues did not have any additional outtakes or bonus tracks.

Track listing
All songs by Robert Palmer except where noted.
"Every Kinda People" (Andy Fraser) – 3:17
"Best of Both Worlds" – 3:54
"Come Over" – 4:06
"Where Can It Go?" – 3:20
"Night People" (Allen Toussaint) – 4:12
"Love Can Run Faster" – 4:02
"You Overwhelm Me" – 3:05
"You Really Got Me" (Ray Davies) – 4:23
"You're Gonna Get What's Coming" – 4:29

Personnel
Robert Palmer – vocals, guitar, percussion
Paul Barrère – guitar, backing vocals
Keith Errol Benson, Richie Hayward, Chris Parker – drums
Harry Bluestone – concertmaster
Michael Brecker – saxophone
Randy Brecker – trumpet
Pierre Brock, Jimmy Williams, Bob Babbitt – bass guitar
Lenny Castro, Robert Greenidge – percussion
Gene Page – string arrangements
John Davis – string arrangements
Freddie Harris, Neil Hubbard, James Mahoney, Donovan McKitty, T.J. Tindall – guitar
Ron Kersey, Edward Putmon, Steve Robbins, James Allen Smith, Louis John Davis – keyboards
Bill Payne – keyboards, backing vocals
Don Renaldo – concertmaster
Brenda Russell – backing vocals
Brian Russell – backing vocals
Allan Schwartzberg – percussion, drums

Production
Producers – Robert Palmer (Tracks #1, 3, 5, 7 & 9) and Tom Moulton (Tracks #2, 4, 6 & 8).
Executive Producer – Chris Blackwell
Engineers – Phill Brown (Tracks #1, 3, 5, 7 & 9), Arthur Stoppe (Tracks #1, 3, 5, 7 & 9) and Tom Moulton  (Tracks #2, 4, 6 & 8).
Recorded at The Hit Factory (New York, NY), Media Sound Recordings (New York, NY) and Sigma Sound Studios (Philadelphia, PA).
Mastered by Jose Rodriguez at Frankford/Wayne Mastering Labs (New York, NY).
Art Direction – Tina Bossidy and Robert Palmer
Photography – Hiro

Charts

Weekly charts

Year-end charts

See also
 List of albums released in 1978

References

External links

Robert Palmer (singer) albums
1978 albums
Island Records albums
Albums produced by Robert Palmer (singer)
Albums produced by Tom Moulton